Lennart Holmqvist (9 January 1933 – 14 December 1996) was a Swedish footballer. He played in two matches for the Sweden national football team from 1951 to 1953. He was also named in Sweden's squad for the Group 2 qualification tournament for the 1954 FIFA World Cup.

References

1933 births
1996 deaths
Swedish footballers
Sweden international footballers
Place of birth missing
Association footballers not categorized by position